Carl Nathaniel Bland (born August 17, 1961 in Fluvanna County, Virginia) is a former wide receiver in the NFL. He played for the Detroit Lions and Green Bay Packers. He also played two seasons with the Calgary Stampeders, where he won a Grey Cup in 1992.

Carl Bland is now a pastor and administrator at Confluence Preparatory high school in St. Louis.

American football wide receivers
Detroit Lions players
Green Bay Packers players
Calgary Stampeders players
Players of American football from Virginia
Virginia Union Panthers football players
Living people
1961 births
Ed Block Courage Award recipients